The Canon PowerShot G1 X Mark II is a large sensor digital compact camera announced by Canon on February 12, 2014. It is the successor of the Canon PowerShot G1 X.

It was replaced by the Canon PowerShot G1 X mark III on Oct 2017.

Sources

G1 X Mark 2
Canon PowerShot G1 X Mark 2